Joni Juho Paavali Puurula (born August 4, 1982) is a Finnish former ice hockey goaltender. Puurula was selected by the Montreal Canadiens in the 8th round (243rd overall) of the 2000 NHL Entry Draft.

Puurula made his SM-liiga debut playing with HPK during the 2000–01 SM-liiga season.

References

External links

1982 births
Living people
AaB Ishockey players
Amur Khabarovsk players
Anglet Hormadi Élite players
Arlan Kokshetau players
Asplöven HC players
SG Cortina players
Finnish ice hockey goaltenders
HPK players
Jokerit players
Kokkolan Hermes players
Leksands IF players
Montreal Canadiens draft picks
SaiPa players
Salavat Yulaev Ufa players
KH Sanok players
IF Sundsvall Hockey players
HC TPS players
Vaasan Sport players
Wipptal Broncos players
People from Kokkola
Sportspeople from Central Ostrobothnia